Françoise Duparc (15 October 1726 – 2 October 1778) was a Spanish born Baroque painter who later lived in France.

Life 
Françoise Duparc was born in Murcia, where her father Antoine Duparc, a French sculptor from Marseille, had settled and married a local Spanish woman. The family returned to Marseille in 1730, and Françoise was introduced to painting by her father and served her apprenticeship in the studio of Jean-Baptiste van Loo in Aix-en-Provence from 1742 to 1745.

It is quite difficult to follow Duparc's course as she worked in different European cities: Paris and London, where she participated in two exhibitions in 1763 and 1766, and Wrocław where she spent time with one of her sisters Claire.

She returned to Marseille in 1771 where she joined the Academy of Painting and Sculpture in 1776. She died shortly after 2 October 1778. Her estate inventory reported forty-one paintings that have not been found with the exception of the four paintings bequeathed by the artist to the city of Marseille, which is currently in the Musée des beaux-arts de Marseille. These tables whose style takes the humble realism of the Le Nain brothers are: Woman with Book, Tea Merchant, Old Woman and Man.

Duparc's works are marked for their simplicity. She usually depicted scenes in all their sincerity, stripping any embellishments. She mostly painted scenes of daily life, common people on the streets and in their homes. Her work bore the influence of the Dutch style.

Françoise Duparc is a member of the Academy of Painting and Sculpture of Marseille and the city gave its name to a street: Rue Francoise Duparc.

Further reading

 Academy of Marseille, Marseille Dictionary, Edisud, Marseille, 2001, p. 126.
 Paul Masson under the direction of, Encyclopedia of Bouches-du-Rhône Departmental Archives, Marseille, 17 volumes, 1913 to 1937.
 Renée Dray-Bensousan Helene Echinard Regine Goutalier Catherine Marand-Fouquet, Richard and Eliane Huguette Vidalou-Latreille, Marseilles: Twenty-six centuries of history, Aix-en-Provence, Edisud, coll. Association "Women and the City", 1999, 240 p., p. 96–97
 André Laurent Alauzen and Noet, Dictionary of painters and sculptors of Provence-Alpes-Côte d'Azur, Marseille, Jeanne Laffitte, 2006 (1st ed. 1986), 473 p., p. 170
 Charles  Bourgeois. A propos d'un tableau : La Marchande de tisane de Françoise Duparc. In: Revue d'histoire de la pharmacie, 58e année, n°206, 1970. pp. 172–176.
 Ann Sutherland Harris, Linda Nochlin. Women Artists: 1550–1950. NY: Alfred A. Knopf, 1976.

References

1726 births
1778 deaths
18th-century French painters
Artists from Marseille